Russell John Sexton (born 9 October 1978) is a former English cricketer.  Sexton was a right-handed batsman who played primarily as a wicketkeeper.  He was born in Derby, Derbyshire.

Sexton represented the Derbyshire Cricket Board in a single List A match against the Middlesex Cricket Board in the first round of the 2003 Cheltenham & Gloucester Trophy, played in 2002.  In his only List A match, he scored a single run and behind the stumps he took a single catch.

References

External links
Russell Sexton at Cricinfo
Russell Sexton at CricketArchive

1978 births
Living people
Cricketers from Derby
English cricketers
Derbyshire Cricket Board cricketers
Wicket-keepers